Georges Gabriel Picard (23 December 1857, Remiremont - 25 January 1943, Yzeures-sur-Creuse) was a French painter, decorative artist, and illustrator, of Jewish ancestry. Some sources give his year of death as 1946.

Biography 

His father, Abraham Picard, was an embroidery maker. He completed his studies at the Lycée Charlemagne in 1877, then entered the École des Beaux-Arts, where he was a student of Jean-Léon Gérôme for two years. In 1879, he was noticed by Paul Philippoteaux, who selected him as one of five assistants to help create panoramas, for exhibition in the United States from 1885 to 1887.

His first individual showing came at the Salon in 1888. The following year, he participated in the "Salon de l'Europe" at the Casino de Monte-Carlo. Then worked with Henri Gervex and Alfred Stevens to produce a triptych for the Exposition Universelle. At the Salon of 1891, his view of the Port of Le Havre was purchased by the government. 
That same year, he began a series of decorations, comprising an allegory of the "Glory of Paris", in the Galerie Lobau at the Hôtel de ville. This would occupy him until 1898. 

As a member of the Commission Administrative des Beaux-Arts, he intervened in favor of his friend, René Lalique, at the Salon of 1895. He was named a Knight in the Legion of Honor in 1904.  

The following year, he was commissioned to decorate the ceremonial dining hall at the French Embassy in Vienna. He produced a diorama with the Palace of Versailles and the Place de la Concorde. Shortly after returning to France, he painted the plafonds in the south pavilion of the Petit Palais. A series of similar commissions followed, at the Teatro Colón in  Buenos Aires, and the Opéra de Lille, among others. 

In addition to painting, he worked as an illustrator for numerous journals. He also illustrated books, including the Contes (fairy tales) of Charles Perrault, as well as several works by Alphonse Daudet and  Charles Nodier.

His wife, Marie Josephine, née Chypre, died in 1938. During the invasion of Alsace in 1940, he was removed from his home in Obernai and deported to Lyon, along with several Jewish families. He was discovered there by an old friend, the photographer Paul Haviland, who took him to his home in Yzeures-sur-Creuse. He died there in 1943, of cardiac arrest.

Selected paintings

References

Further reading 
 Gérard Schurr, Les Petits Maîtres de la peinture 1820-1920, valeur de demain, Vol.VII, Paris, Les Éditions de l'Amateur, 1989

External links 

 Raymond Escholier, Le nouveau Paris, la vie artistique de la cité moderne, Paris, Éd. Nilsson, 1913 (Page 59) (Page 118)

1857 births
1943 deaths
19th-century French painters
Fresco painters
French illustrators
People from Remiremont
20th-century French painters